Butiama District is one of the seven districts of Mara Region of Tanzania. It is borderedto the north by Roya District  aross the Kirumi Bridge on the Mara river.  Its administrative centre is the town of Butiama. Julius Nyerere was born in Butiama; the Mwalimu Nyerere Museum is located in his town of birth.

According to the 2012 Tanzania National Census, the population of the Butiama District was 241,732.

Transport

Road
Paved Trunk road T4 from Mwanza to the Kenyan border passes through Butiama District from south to north. Trunk road T17 from Musoma to Arusha Region passes through the district from north to south.

Administrative subdivisions
As of 2012, Butiama District was administratively divided into 20 wards.

Wards

 Bisumwa
 Buhemba
 Bukabwa
 Buruma
 Busegwe
 Bumangi
 Buswahili
 Butiama
 Butuguri
 Bwiregi
 Etaro
 Kukirango
 Kyanyari
 Masaba
 Mirwa
 Muriaza
 Nyakatende
 Nyamimange
 Nyankanga
 Nyegina
 Sirorisimba

References

Districts of Mara Region